Sayf al-Dawla was the honorific epithet of Ali ibn Abu'l-Hayja Abdallah, Hamdanid emir of Aleppo in 945–967.

Sayf al-Dawla may also refer to:
 Buluggin ibn Ziri, first Zirid emir of Ifriqiya, 972–984
 Khalaf ibn Mula'ib, emir of Apamea and Homs, 1082–1090/91 and 1095/96–1106
 Sayf al-Dawla ibn Hud al-Mustansir, Andalusian adventurer, briefly ruler of Córdoba in 1145
 Saif ud Daulah or Najabut Ali Khan, Nawab of Bengal, 1766–1770
 Sayf ol-Dowleh an Iranian prince of Qajar dynasty, governor of Isfahan, 1820-1835
 Abd al-Malik al-Muzaffar, an 'Amirid ruler of Al-Andalus, 1002-1008

See also
 Mahmud of Ghazni or Yamin al-Dawla wa Amin al-Milla (971 – 1030), ruler of the Ghaznavid Empire